Walter Norman Koelz (September 11, 1895, Waterloo, Michigan – September 24, 1989) was an American zoologist and museum collector.

Walter Koelz's parents were immigrants from the Black Forest region of Germany, and his father was a village blacksmith in Waterloo. Walter Koelz studied zoology and received the degree of Doctor of Philosophy from the University of Michigan in 1920. In 1925 he joined the McMillan Expedition to the American Arctic. He also studied whitefishes during his work at the University of Michigan at the Institute for Fisheries Research. He was offered a post with the Himalayan Research Institute of the Roerich Museum in 1930. He visited Naggar in Kulu, in May 1930, to begin botanical explorations. While collecting he met Thakur Rup Chand who joined him in his efforts. Koelz would work with Chand for over thirty years. Koelz returned to Michigan in 1932, but his interest in Tibetan culture led to his appointment as a Research Fellow on the Charles L. Freer Fund in September 1932.

In 1933 he returned to Indian Tibet to collect anthropology related material for the University of Michigan.  In 1936 Dr. Koelz travelled once more to India to collect plants. For seven years from 1939 he explored Persia, Nepal, and parts of India including Assam and made a large collection of birds. In 1956 he was awarded the Meyer Memorial Award for outstanding contributions to the world of Agriculture. He found and brought back a disease-resistant wild melon from Calcutta that helped save the California melon crop one year. He had collected nearly 30,000 bird specimens for the University of Michigan's zoology museum and some 30,000 plants for the U. of M. herbarium.

Koelz often described new subspecies often on the sole basis of assuming that the population was isolated. Many of the subspecies of birds that he described from India are now invalid. Of the fish Coregonus artedii which is found in lakes and consists of isolated populations he described no less than 24 subspecies.

Publications

Notes

References
 Kathleen McCleary, Obituary: Walter Koelz/environment column. Sports Illustrated

External links
 Journal of the 1931 expedition, Urusvati
 University of Michigan
 

1895 births
University of Michigan alumni
American ornithologists
1989 deaths
20th-century American zoologists